Kittisak Namdash (born 4 August 1995) is a Thai badminton player. He was the boys' doubles champion at the Singapore Youth International tournament partnered with Peeranat Boontan. In 2013, he won double title at the Thailand Junior Championships in the boys' singles and doubles event. Namdash was part of the Thailand team that won the mixed team bronze medal at the 2017 Summer Universiade. He won his first senior international title at the 2018 Thailand Masters in the men's doubles event partnered with Tinn Isriyanet.

Achievements

BWF World Tour (1 title, 1 runner-up) 
The BWF World Tour, which was announced on 19 March 2017 and implemented in 2018, is a series of elite badminton tournaments sanctioned by the Badminton World Federation (BWF). The BWF World Tour is divided into levels of World Tour Finals, Super 1000, Super 750, Super 500, Super 300, and the BWF Tour Super 100.

Men's doubles

BWF International Challenge/Series (1 runner-up) 
Men's doubles

  BWF International Challenge tournament
  BWF International Series tournament

References

External links 
 

Living people
1995 births
Kittisak Namdash
Kittisak Namdash
Badminton players at the 2018 Asian Games
Kittisak Namdash
Competitors at the 2019 Southeast Asian Games
Kittisak Namdash
Southeast Asian Games medalists in badminton
Universiade bronze medalists for Thailand
Universiade medalists in badminton
Medalists at the 2017 Summer Universiade